Lee In (born June 14, 1984) is a South Korean actor. He made his acting debut as a child actor in 1998 using the stage name Lee Joon. He began using his real name professionally in 2008.

Filmography

Television series

Film

References

External links
 Lee In Fan Cafe at Daum 
 
 
 

1984 births
Living people
South Korean male film actors
South Korean male television actors
South Korean male child actors